Fresh! is the debut album by Australian dance-pop singer-songwriter Gina G, released in 1997. The album includes the single "Ooh Aah... Just a Little Bit", which was the United Kingdom's entry in the 1996 Eurovision Song Contest. Following the contest, the single reached number one in the UK and went on to become a worldwide hit.

Singles
The lead single "Ooh Aah... Just a Little Bit", written by Simon Tauber and Steve Rodway, was first released in March 1996 in the UK. It was selected as the UK's entry for the 1996 Eurovision Song Contest, which took place in Oslo, Norway. Despite placing eighth, the song went on to achieve worldwide success, peaking at No. 1 on the UK Singles Chart and No. 12 on the Billboard Hot 100 the following year. It is one of very few Eurovision entries to chart in the US market. The album features five additional singles, four of which were co-written by Gina G. "I Belong to You" and "Fresh!" (both peaked at No. 6 in the UK), "Ti Amo" (No. 11), "Gimme Some Love" (No. 25) and the final single "Every Time I Fall", the first ballad to be released from the album, (No. 52).

Commercial performance
The album peaked at No. 12 on the UK Albums Chart and No. 27 on the US Billboard Heatseekers chart. It was certified Silver (marking sales of 60,000) in the United Kingdom.

Album artwork
The album artwork features Gina G covered in chocolate icing, and was shot by famed photographer David LaChapelle.

Track listing

Charts

Certifications

Release history

References

1997 debut albums
Gina G albums